Klokočí may refer to places in the Czech Republic:

Klokočí (Přerov District), a municipality and village in the Olomouc Region
Klokočí (Semily District), a municipality and village in the Liberec Region
Klokočí, a village and part of Olší (Brno-Country District) in the South Moravian Region